The Rink may refer to:

The Rink (film), a 1916 Charlie Chaplin film
 The Rink (musical), a 1984 Kander and Ebb musical
The Rink (Indianapolis, Indiana), listed on the U.S. National Register of Historic Places in Indianapolis, Indiana

See also
 Rink (disambiguation)